GDY may refer to:

 GDY, the FAA LID code for Grundy Municipal Airport, Virginia, United States
 GDY, the Indian Railways station code for Guindy railway station, Chennai, Tamil Nadu, India